World Women's Championship may refer to:

Wrestling
 Women's World Championship
 WWWA World Single Championship
 NWA World Women's Championship
 CMLL World Women's Championship
 AAA Reina de Reinas Championship, a world professional wrestling championship
 Impact Knockouts World Championship
 ICE Cross Infinity Championship, a world professional wrestling championship
 World of Stardom Championship
 World Woman Pro-Wrestling Diana World Championship
 ICW Women's Championship, a world professional wrestling championship
 WWE Raw Women's Championship, a world professional wrestling championship
 SWA World Championship
 WWE SmackDown Women's Championship, a world professional wrestling championship
 Women of Honor World Championship
 AEW Women's World Championship
 ROH Women's World Championship
 MLW World Women's Featherweight Championship, a world professional wrestling championship
 IWGP Women's Championship, a world professional wrestling championship

Other
 Women's World Chess Championship
 IHF World Women's Handball Championship
 World Women's Curling Championship
 IIHF World Women's Championship (ice hockey)